A radio sweeper is a short, pre-recorded sample used by radio stations as segues between songs that give listeners a brief station identifier or promo, generally 20 seconds or less: "You're listening to the soft sounds of [NAME] radio. Easy listening throughout the Bay Area," for example. 

Dry radio sweepers are voice only—no music or sound effects—whereas wet sweepers generally contain sound FX (also known as "sonic", a global term for all sound effects and elements used in a sweeper.)

Sweepers are also known as liners, bumpers, radio imaging, sweeps, station imaging, stingers, IDs, idents, promos, shotguns and intros. Most sweepers will have a voice over included on the audio.

References

Radio broadcasting